Paul Garmirian, or P.G, is a  cigar brand named after its founder, Armenian-American cigar connoisseur Paul Garmirian. It is made entirely with Dominican grown tobacco.

History
Paul Garmirian founded his company in 1990 after doing extensive research on cigars for his book The Gourmet Guide to Cigars, published the same year. The company sells its products only via retail locations.

Cigar lines
Paul Garmirian Symphony 20 - Limited Edition
Paul Garmirian Gourmet Series 15th Anniversary
Paul Garmirian Soiree
Paul Garmirian Gourmet Series
Paul Garmirian Gourmet II
Paul Garmirian Maduro
Paul Garmirian Reserva Exculsiva
Artisans Selection by Paul Garmirian
PG Artisan's Passion by Paul Garmirian

Notable smokers
Notable Paul Garmirian cigar smokers include Presidents Bill Clinton, George H. W. Bush, and George W. Bush and other Washington insiders. Law & Order star Fred Thompson, The West Wing actor Richard Schiff, and David Letterman are also known to smoke PG cigars.

References

External links
 Official site

Cigar brands